Kurt Loserth (born 26 November 1914, date of death unknown) was an Austrian bobsledder who competed during the 1950s. Competing in two Winter Olympics, he earned his best finish of seventh in the four-man event at Cortina d'Ampezzo in 1956.

References
1952 bobsleigh four-man results
1956 bobsleigh four-man results
Bobsleigh four-man results: 1948-64
Kurt Loserth's profile at Sports Reference.com

1914 births
Year of death missing
Austrian male bobsledders
Bobsledders at the 1952 Winter Olympics
Bobsledders at the 1956 Winter Olympics
Olympic bobsledders of Austria